Pseudophilautus asankai, commonly called Asanka's shrub frog, is a species of frogs in the family Rhacophoridae.

It is endemic to Sri Lanka.

Its natural habitats are subtropical or tropical moist montane forests and heavily degraded former forest.
It is threatened by habitat loss.

References

asankai
Endemic fauna of Sri Lanka
Frogs of Sri Lanka
Taxa named by Rohan Pethiyagoda
Amphibians described in 2004
Taxonomy articles created by Polbot